Harry Ward (8 December 1924 – 2 December 1993) was an Australian cricketer. He played one first-class match for Tasmania in 1948/49.

See also
 List of Tasmanian representative cricketers

References

External links
 

1924 births
1993 deaths
Australian cricketers
Tasmania cricketers
Cricketers from Hobart